Maria Grigorievna Razumovskaya  (10 April 1772 - 9 August 1865) was a Russian noblewoman and patron of the arts.

Her salon in St Petersburg was visited by Emperor Nicholas I and Empress Alexandra.

References

External links 

Russian women
1772 births
1865 deaths